Birgte is a small village at the north edge of the Teutoburger Wald and is as such part of Riesenbeck which is part of the town Hörstel. Its root goes back until 1800 BC as an old farming area. First known written mention of Birgte is dated 1088 AD when single farms dominated the area.

People 
 Karl-Josef Laumann (born 1957), politician (CDU)

Villages in Lower Saxony
Steinfurt (district)